Traps is a 1994 Australian film directed by Pauline Chan and starring Saskia Reeves, Jacqueline McKenzie, and Sami Frey.

It is not to be confused with the other Australian film named Traps (1985).

Premise 
Set in Vietnam during the 1950s, journalist Michael Duffield (Robert Reynolds) and his English photographer wife Louisa (Saskia Reeves) arrive at the plantation of a Frenchman named Daniel (Sami Frey) and his daughter Sarah (Jacqueline McKenzie).

Cast 
 Saskia Reeves as Louise Duffield
 Robert Reynolds as Michael Duffield
 Jacqueline McKenzie as Viola
 Sami Frey as Daniel

References

External links
 
 Traps at Oz Movies

1994 films
1994 thriller films
Australian thriller films
Films based on Australian novels
1990s English-language films
1990s Australian films